Rõivas is an Estonian surname. Notable people with the surname include:

Luisa Rõivas (born 1987), Estonian singer
Taavi Rõivas (born 1979), Estonian politician

Estonian-language surnames